Christopher "Cris" Agterberg (22 April 1883 – 21 November 1948) was a Dutch artist and ceramist.

Life and work 
Agterberg was born in Amsterdam as the son of Christopher Agterberg sr., plasterer, and Alida Gramberg. He studied at the Quellinus school and the crafts school in Elberfeld, Germany. In 1905 he married Rebecca Hartgers, who was active as a textile designer. Agterberg made ceramics, worked in wood, glass, leather and metal, designed jewelry and masks and was bookbinding designer. He called himself "sculptor and decorative artist."

In 1932 he joined the National Socialist Movement (NSB) from Anton Mussert, with the registration number 57. During the early years of the NSB he designed the hall decorations for the propaganda meetings. The first headquarters of the NSB, the Oudegracht in Utrecht, was located in the building that was originally the studio Agterberg. During World War II he was a member of the Advisory Council for assignments to artists for the related arts. The Council was founded by "The Dutch House of Art," a by the Nazi Department of Public Information and the Arts brought to life organ. In the same period Agterberg managed in Utrecht the exhibition gallery "The Consthuys St. Peter," which was regarded as a branch of the Dutch Kunsthuis. He also designed several awards for the NSB, as the plaque "Struggle and Sacrifice" and an "Eastern Front"-plaque.

In 1947 Agterberg was convicted for his behavior during the German occupation. It was after the sentencing set free immediately, because the pronounced sentence was equal to the time spent in custody. The verdict had taken into consideration that Agterberg suffering from a fatal illness, and that he had never betrayed anyone. He died the following year in Utrecht.

In 2002 there took place in the Centraal Museum in Utrecht an exhibition place with furniture, jewelry and small utensils designed by Cris Agterberg.

Work in public collections 
 Rijksmuseum, Amsterdam 
 Princessehof Ceramics Museum, Leeuwarden

Bibliography (selection) 
 Brouwer, M. and Haffmans, J. (2001) Cris Agterberg; sculptor and decorative artist . Vianen:.
 Karsten, JM (2006) insignia of the Movement: an illustrated overview with insignia of the National Socialist Movement 1931-1945 . Lunteren Promil. .
 Kuyvenhoven, F. (2010) Index Dutch visual artists, photographers and art zealots . .
 Venema, A. (1986) Art dealers in the Netherlands 1940-1945 . Amsterdam: Workers Press. .

See also 
 List of Dutch ceramists
 List of Dutch sculptors

References

External links 

  Agterberg, Christoffel - Cris at capriolus.nl.

1883 births
1948 deaths
Dutch ceramists
Dutch male sculptors
Artists from Amsterdam
20th-century Dutch sculptors
20th-century ceramists
21st-century ceramists
20th-century Dutch male artists